Streak: Hoverboard Racing is a 1998 video game from SingleTrac.

Development
The game was developed by the same team that did Jet Moto.

Reception

GameSpot gave the game a score of 5.1 out of 10 criticizing the "questionable physics, stiff animation, low polygon counts, and ridiculously difficult tracks."

References

1998 video games
GT Interactive games
PlayStation (console) games
PlayStation (console)-only games
Racing video games